Slagmaur is a Norwegian black metal band from Brekstad and Trondheim, formed in 1997 and originally named Norske Synder.

History 
Slagmaur was formed in 1997 under the name Norske Synder ("Norwegian Sins" in Norwegian) before changing name in 2006. An official band statement claimed them to be "the darkest and scariest black metal band to ever set foot on planet earth". The band is quite secretive and little is known about the band members, although it is known that Mehimoloth from Celestial Bloodshed was a member of the band until his death in 2009. They have described their sound as "twisted and sinister Black Metal, multi layered and complex". The band have also attracted interest for their conceptualized, unusual imagery and live shows which display a theatrical horror aesthetic and bizarre live antics. Their set at the 2017 edition of the Inferno festival, which quickly generated controversy, featured staged executions by hanging as well as a model/stuntman tied to an upside-down cross which was set on fire at the end of the show, while band members "prowled around the stage, looking genuinely psychotic and to be gaining pleasure from the on-stage executions". The concert reportedly induced strong discomfort among the audience and has been described as "one of the most extreme live acts ever performed", with renowned heavy metal magazine Metal Hammer reporting "It's not easy to shock in black metal today, but Slagmaur did it".

Personnel

Current line up

 Lt. Wardr – Drums and keyboards (2006–present)
 General Gribbsphiiser - Vocals (lead & choirs), Guitars, Bass, Drums, Piano, Synths, Cello, Music, Lyrics (2006–present)
 Aatselgribb - Vocals (lead), Bass, Piano (2006–present)
 Dr. Von Hellreich - Vocals (lead) (2016–present)

Past members

Mehimoloth (Steingrim Torson) - Vocals (2007-2009)

Live/session members

Mr. Unt Zilla - Bass, Guitars, Programming (2006–present)

Discography
 Svin (Demo) (2006)
 Skrekk (Demo) (2006
 Domfeldt (Demo) (2007)
 Skrekk Lich Kunstler (2007)
 Von Rov Shelter (2009)
 Thill Smitts Terror  (2017)
 Hulders Ritualet (to be released in 2020)

References

Norwegian black metal musical groups
Musical groups established in 1997
1997 establishments in Norway